Dover is a relatively small neighbourhood of Singapore, located in Queenstown. It is bordered by Ghim Moh to the north, Kent Ridge to the south and southeast, one-north and Queenstown to the east, Commonwealth and Holland Village to the northeast Clementi to the west and West Coast to the southwest. It is often a noted location due to the sheer number of educational facilities it holds, while lying in a zone between the Central Area and near industrial zone in the vicinity of Jurong.

Etymology and history
The Dover neighbourhood was formerly a British military and residential area. Hence, many road names in the area are derived from English (specifically Kentish) place names. For example, those in Medway Park off Dover Road include names associated with the southern coastal areas of England, including Folkestone and Maidstone, apart from Dover itself. The name "Dover" is from the Celtic word meaning "The Waters", alluding to the English Channel. Medway Park, for instance, is named after the River Medway, which marks the middle of Kent. Kent is the English county where the town of Dover, the namesake is located

Roads in Dover
Dover Road
Dover Crescent
Dover Close East
Dover Avenue
Dover Drive
Dover Rise

Transport
There are two Mass Rapid Transit (MRT) stations which are in proximity to Dover. One is Dover MRT station, which is EW22 on the East West MRT line, and the other is Buona Vista MRT station which is EW21/CC22. However, neither MRT station is situated near the heart of Dover. The former is located next to Singapore Polytechnic, whilst the latter at the intersection of North Buona Vista Road and Commonwealth Avenue. A portion of most residents drop at Dover MRT station (East West line) and transfer to a bus (14, 74, 105, 106, 166 or 185), while another portion drop at Buona Vista MRT station (East West line and Circle line), takes a kilometre walk to Dover or transfer to buses 14, 74 or 196. Alternately, one-north MRT station is within walking distance of the eastern end of Dover, although not being located in it.

Education

Dover is known for having many schools and education institutions in its neighbourhood and vicinity.

Primary schools
 Fairfield Methodist Primary School
Secondary schools
Anglo-Chinese School (Independent)
Fairfield Methodist Secondary School
Nan Hua High School
New Town Secondary School
NUS High School of Math and Science
School of Science and Technology, Singapore
Higher institutions of learning
National University of Singapore (NUS) (Kent Ridge)
Singapore Institute of Technology (SIT) (Dover Campus, previously occupied by Singapore University of Technology and Design till 2015)
Singapore Polytechnic
Anglo-Chinese Junior College
INSEAD
International schools
Dover Court International School
 Japanese Secondary School (Clementi)
 Norwegian Supplementary School
 United World College of South East Asia
Other education institutions
 Ministry of Education (Singapore)

References

 
Places in Singapore
Housing estates in Singapore
Queenstown, Singapore